The Lom is a river in northwestern Bulgaria, a right tributary of the Danube flowing into it 1 km east of the town of Lom.

The river takes its source from the foot of Midzhur (2,168 m), the highest peak of western Stara Planina, on the Bulgarian-Serbian border, and mainly flows northeast until its upper course, where it heads north. It passes the villages of Gorni Lom, Dolni Lom, Sredogriv, Falkovets, Ruzhintsi, Drazhintsi, Belo Pole, Roglets, Drenovets, Topolovets, Knyazheva Mahala, Kriva Bara, Vasilovtsi, Staliyska Mahala, Traykovo, as well as three quarters of the town of Lom: Momin Brod, Dalgoshevtsi and Golintsi.

References

Rivers of Bulgaria
Landforms of Vidin Province
Landforms of Montana Province